The Roman Catholic Diocese of Rajshahi is a diocese located in the city of Rajshahi in the Ecclesiastical province of Dhaka in Bangladesh.

History
 May 21, 1990: Established as the Diocese of Rajshahi from the Diocese of Dinajpur

Leadership
 Bishops of Rajshahi (Roman rite)
 Bishop Patrick D’Rozario, C.S.C. (May 21, 1990 – February 3, 1995), appointed Bishop of Chittagong; future Archbishop and Cardinal
 Bishop Paulinus Costa (January 11, 1996 – July 9, 2005), appointed Archbishop of Dhaka
 Bishop Gervas Rozario (January 15, 2007 – present)

Information
 High School       = 3
St. Louis High School, Jonail, Natore, Bangladesh.
St. Joseph High School and College, Bonpara, Natore, Bangladesh.
St. Rita's High School, Chatmohor, Pabna, Bangladesh.
 Primary School    = 17
 Parish            = 19
 Seminary          = 1
 Health Center     = 13

Prominent Persons
 Denis C Baskey, Director, Caritas Rajshahi Region
 William Atul Kuluntunu, Joint Sectary (OSD), Ministry of Entailment

References

Roman Catholic dioceses in Bangladesh
Christian organizations established in 1990
Roman Catholic dioceses and prelatures established in the 20th century
Rajshahi, Roman Catholic Diocese of